Instructional modeling is a common pedagogical practice where an instructor “acts out” or conducts an exhibition of proper skill performance, process execution, or cognitive processing (e.g. think-aloud). Students refer to the instructor’s model and attempt to mimic or reproduce what they observed. Repetition of instructor modeling and subsequent student reproduction promotes automaticity of taught skills, procedures and cognition, which improves student performance. 

Quite often, instructional modeling is utilized in conjunction with role playing. Joint modeling and role playing practices may follow an “I do, We do, You do” instructional scaffolding strategy: “I do” refers to the instructor’s modeling of a concept; “We do” involves students performing the concept (i.e. either a reproduction of the instructor’s model or a role playing scenario) with instructor support; “You do” refers to students’ autonomous performance of the concept (i.e. through a role playing scenario, modeling reproduction, or real-world application).

Pedagogy